Wolfgang Lippert (14 September 1914 – 3 December 1941) was a World War II  Luftwaffe Flying ace. Lippert was credited with 30 victories, five of which were scored in the Spanish Civil War.

Military career

Luftwaffe career
Lippert joined the Luftwaffe and after pilot training, was posted to I./Jagdgeschwader 134 "Horst Wessel". In  March 1937 Leutnant Lippert was transferred to I./Jagdgeschwader 53 at Wiesbaden. Lippert gained his first aerial victories during the Spanish Civil War flying with the Condor Legion with 3. Staffel of Jagdgruppe 88. He claimed five victories from mid-1938 until March 1939, receiving the award of the Spanish Cross in Gold with Swords.

He claimed his first victory of World War II on 30 September 1939, a French Morane-Saulnier M.S.406 over Wissembourg. During the Battle of France he destroyed eight Allied aircraft.

Group commander

On 4 September 1940, Hauptmann Lippert was appointed Gruppenkommandeur (group commander) of II. Gruppe of Jagdgeschwader 27 (JG 27—27th Fighter Wing). He thus succeeded Oberleutnant Ernst Düllberg who had temporarily replaced Hauptmann Werner Andres after his transfer.

During the Battle of Britain, a further seven kills were claimed, including Royal Air Force ace S/L Archie McKellar flying a No. 605 Squadron Hurricane Mk 1, shot down on 1 November 1940. He was awarded the Ritterkreuz des Eisernen Kreuzes on 24 September after 13 World War II victories.

In 1941 Lippert participated with II./JG 27 in Operation Barbarossa, scoring four victories against Soviet aircraft. Later that year the unit was transferred to North Africa where he destroyed a further five Allied aircraft.

Death
On 23 November 1941 Lippert was shot down over Allied lines near Bir el Gubi, probably by Flight Lieutenant Clive Caldwell of No. 250 Squadron. As Lippert bailed out of his Bf 109 F-4 (Werknummer 8469—factory number), he hit the tailplane. He was hospitalised in Cairo and his legs were amputated. However, his legs were infected by gangrene and he died on 3 December.

Summary of career

Aerial victory claims
Mathews and Foreman, authors of Luftwaffe Aces — Biographies and Victory Claims, researched the German Federal Archives and found records for 29 aerial victory claims, plus one further unconfirmed claim. This number includes five claims during the Spanish Civil War, three on the Eastern Front and further 21 over the Western Allies of World War II.

Awards
 Spanienkreuz in Gold mit Schwerten
 Flugzeugführerabzeichen
 Front Flying Clasp of the Luftwaffe
 Iron Cross (1939)
 2nd Class
 1st Class
 Knight's Cross of the Iron Cross on 24 September 1940 as Hauptmann and Gruppenkommandeur of the II./Jagdgeschwader 27

Notes

References

Citations

Bibliography

 
 
 
 
 
 
 
 
 
 
 
 
 
 
 
 

1914 births
1941 deaths
Aviators killed by being shot down
Spanish Civil War flying aces
German World War II flying aces
Luftwaffe personnel killed in World War II
German military personnel of the Spanish Civil War
Recipients of the Knight's Cross of the Iron Cross
People from the Kingdom of Saxony
Condor Legion personnel
People from Zwickau (district)
Military personnel from Saxony
Deaths from gangrene